Sithembiso Ndwandwa (born 10 November 1989) is a South African cricketer. He played in eighteen first-class, twelve List A, and six Twenty20 matches between 2013 and 2016.

See also
 List of Eastern Province representative cricketers

References

External links
 

1989 births
Living people
South African cricketers
Eastern Province cricketers
South Western Districts cricketers
Cricketers from Port Elizabeth